Yalda Moaiery is an Iranian photojournalist, she is known for war, protest, natural disaster, and conflict photographs. In 2019, she gained international notoriety after Donald Trump had used one of her photos on social media to support an attack on Iran, which she publicly spoke out on. During the Mahsa Amini protests in 2022 she was one of around twenty journalists arrested in Iran. She is a member of the Iranian Photojournalists Association (IPJA).

Background 
Throughout her career, Moaiery has documented wars, conflicts and natural disasters in parts of the world including Iran, Afghanistan, Iraq and Lebanon. Her photographs have been featured in international magazines and newspapers, such as Time, Newsweek, San Francisco Chronicle, Le Monde and El Pais.

Moaiery’s 20-year career has taken her around the world but her work also focuses on life in Iran, including mass protests in 2019 over rising fuel prices. Her portfolio includes photo essays on women serving in the Iranian military and the legacy of Iran’s Supreme Leader Khomeini.

In 2019, she gained notoriety when she spoke out against President Donald Trump after he used one of her photos on instagram to attack the Iranian government.

Arrest 
Moaiery was arrested on September 19, 2022 by security agents in downtown Tehran while covering the protests that erupted after the death of Mahsa Amini while in the custody of the morality police in Tehran. Moaiery was reportedly hit during her arrest and forced into a van with tens of other female protesters before being taken to Qarchak prison, a female-only detention facility in the city of Varamin, southeast of Tehran.

After the news of Moaiery’s arrest surfaced, the Tehran Province Journalists' Association issued a statement demanding her immediate release, saying that she had been detained “while staunchly defending colleagues’ freedom of movement in covering events”. She was released on bail on December 20, 2022.

See also 
 Niloofar Hamedi
 Elaheh Mohammadi

References 

Living people
Iranian journalists
Iranian women journalists
Iranian prisoners and detainees
Year of birth missing (living people)
Mahsa Amini protests
Women photojournalists
War photographers